
Gmina Żabno is an urban-rural gmina (administrative district) in Tarnów County, Lesser Poland Voivodeship, in southern Poland.

Villages
Apart from the town of Żabno, Gmina Żabno contains the villages and settlements of Bobrowniki Wielkie, Chorążec, Czyżów, Fiuk, Goruszów, Gorzyce, Ilkowice, Janikowice, Kaluga, Kłyż, Łęg Tarnowski, Nieciecza, Niedomice, Odporyszów, Otfinów, Pasieka Otfinowska, Piaski, Pierszyce, Podlesie Dębowe, Siedliszowice, Sieradza, Wychylówka and Zagrody.

Neighbouring gminas
Gmina Żabno is bordered by the city of Tarnów and by the gminas of Dąbrowa Tarnowska, Gręboszów, Lisia Góra, Olesno, Radłów, Tarnów, Wierzchosławice and Wietrzychowice.

References
Polish official population figures 2006

Zabno
Tarnów County